Henry Pepwell (or Pepwall) (died 1539 or 1540) was an English printer.

Born in Birmingham, Pepwell set up business from 1518 at the former house of the stationer Henry Jacobi in St Paul's Churchyard, London. The first book he printed was William Neville's Castell of Pleasure. He was also involved with printing early English humanist works. In 1525-6 he was warden of the Company of Stationers.

References
Alexandra Gillespie, ‘Pepwell , Henry (d. 1539/40)’, Oxford Dictionary of National Biography, Oxford University Press, 2004, accessed 25 Oct 2007

External links
 
 

1540 deaths
English printers
Year of birth unknown
People from Birmingham, West Midlands
16th-century English businesspeople